Dwyre is a surname. Notable people with the surname include:

Bill Dwyre (born 1944), American columnist
Jesse Aaron Dwyre, Canadian actor, musician, and writer

See also
Dwyer (name)
O'Dwyer (surname)